Estonian Aviation Academy is a state-owned institution educating and training personnel for Estonian aviation enterprises and organizations. The academy is situated near the Tartu Airport. Instruction at the Estonian Aviation Academy meets the curricular requirements of the country's Ministry of Education and Research, as well as international agencies (ICAO, JAA, EASA and EUROCONTROL).

Mission
The mission of the Estonian Aviation Academy is to educate, train aviation personnel (at international standards), develop national aviation culture, and support the development of activities in the field of aviation.

Learning environment
The main building, that was completed in 2011, is situated beside of the Tartu Airport.

Overview of Specialties
 Air Traffic Services
 Management of Aviation Communication and Navigation Surveillance
 Aircraft Piloting
 Airplane Piloting
 Helicopter Piloting
 Aviation Management
 Aircraft Engineering

Rectors
Illari Lään (-2020)
Koit Kaskel (2020-)

Co-operation partners in Estonia
Estonian Aviation Academy has developed links with aviation enterprises and higher educational institutions in Estonia and abroad, including:

 Estonian Air
 Estonian Air Force
 Estonian Air Navigation Services
 Estonian Aviation Museum
 Estonian Border Guard Aviation Group
 Estonian Civil Aviation Administration
 Estonian National Defence College
 Estonian University of Life Sciences
 Magnetic MRO (ex. Air Maintenance Estonia)
 Ministry of Economic Affairs and Communications
 Ministry of Education and Research
 Pakker Avio
 Tallinn Airport, Ltd.
 Tallinn University
 Tallinn University of Applied Sciences
 Tallinn University of Technology
 University of Tartu
 Ülenurme High School

Co-operation partners in other countries
  Anadolu University School of Aviation
  Avia College
  EUROCONTROL Institute of ANS
  Helsinki-Vantaa Airport
  Hochschule Bremen
  Hogeschool van Amsterdam
  Finnair
  Katholieke Hogeschool Kempen
  Lufthansa Technical Training
  Lund University School of Aviation
  Lycon Engineering AB
  Mayflower College
  National Defence University of Warsaw
  Patria Pilot Training OY
  Riga Technical University
  SAS Flight Academy
  Transport and Telecommunication Institute
  University of Maryland Eastern Shore
  Vilnius Gediminas Technical University
  Technical University of Košice

Gallery

References

External links

1993 establishments in Estonia
Aviation in Estonia
Aviation schools
Technical universities and colleges in Estonia
Educational institutions established in 1993
Kambja Parish
Universities and colleges in Estonia